E91 may refer to:
 E91 protocol, a protocol of Quantum Cryptography
 E91, a car of the BMW 3  Series
 King's Indian Defense, Encyclopaedia of Chess Openings code
 European route E91, one of the many routes in the European route network.
 Minami-Hanna Road and Yamatotakada Bypass, route E91 in Japan.